Doña Carmen station is an under-construction Manila Metro Rail Transit (MRT) station situated on Line 7. The station will be located along Commonwealth Avenue, Fairview, Quezon City.

When completed, the station will be close to Doña Carmen Subdivision.

External links
Proposed Doña Carmen MRT Station

Manila Metro Rail Transit System stations
Proposed railway stations in the Philippines